Oboronia albicosta is a butterfly in the family Lycaenidae. It is found in Cameroon, the Democratic Republic of the Congo (Equateur, Kinshasa, Sankuru, Lualaba and Kivu), Uganda (from the south-western part of the country to Bwamba) and Zambia.

References

Butterflies described in 1916
Polyommatini
Butterflies of Africa